Ophel ( ‘ōp̄el), also Graecised to ophlas, is the biblical term given to a certain part of a settlement or city that is elevated from its surroundings, and probably means fortified hill or risen area. In the Hebrew Bible, the term is used in reference to two cities: Jerusalem, as in the Book of Chronicles and Book of Nehemiah, and Samaria, mentioned in the Books of Kings. The Mesha Stele, written in Moabite, a Canaanite language closely related to Biblical Hebrew, is the only extra-biblical source using the word, also in connection to a fortified place.

Meaning of the term
Ophel, with the definite article ha-ophel, is a common noun known from two Ancient Semitic languages, Biblical Hebrew and Moabitic. As a place name or description it appears several times in the Hebrew Bible and once on the Mesha Stele from Moab. There is no ultimate agreement as to its exact meaning, and scholars have long been trying to deduce it from the different contexts it appears in. When used as a common noun, it has been translated as "tumors", and in a verbal form it was taken to mean "puffed up", this indicating that the root might be associated with "swelling". When referring to a place, it seems from the context to mean either hill, or fortified place, or a mixture of the two, i.e., a fortified hill, and by considering the presumed meaning of the root, it might signify a "bulging or rounded" fortification.

On the Mesha Stele, named for the king of Moab who erected it, Mesha says: "I built Q-R-CH-H (Karhah?), the wall of ye'arim [forests], and the wall of ophel and I built its gates and I built its towers." Here ophel is commonly translated as "citadel".

Jerusalem ophel

Hebrew Bible
In current terms, the still extant Herodian cased-in Temple Mount is bordered to the south by a saddle, followed by the ridge in case, also known as the southeastern hill, which stretches down to the King's Garden and the (lower) Siloam Pool. If the ophel was, as it seems, close to its centre, the use of the term "ophel ridge" for the entire southeastern hill including the saddle, seems to be wrong.

Two kings of Judah, Jotham and Manasseh, are described to have massively strengthened the ophel fortifications, leading to the conclusion that this must have been an area of great strategic importance, and either very close to or identical with the "stronghold of Zion" conquered and reused by King David.

Josephus' ophlas
Josephus, writing about the First Jewish–Roman War (66–70 CE), uses the Graecised form ophlas, and places it slightly higher up the eastern ridge from the First Temple-period ophel, touching the "eastern cloister of the temple" (Jewish Wars, V, iv, 2 ) and in the context of "the temple and the parts thereto adjoining, .... and the .... 'Valley of the Cedron'" (Jewish Wars, V, iv, 1 ). This takes us to the area of the saddle right next to the southeast corner of Herod's Temple Mount.

Wadi Hilweh excavation

Benjamin Mazar and Eilat Mazar began excavating an area identified as Jerusalem's ophel, lying on the rise to the north of the Wadi Hilweh neighbourhood, in 1968. The term is commonly used by archaeologists with this meaning. The excavation work was a joint project of Hebrew University, in cooperation with the Israel Antiquities Authority, the Israel Nature and Parks Authority, and the East Jerusalem Development Company, with funding provided by Jewish American couple, Daniel Mintz and Meredith Berkman.

Notable structures found during these excavations include architectural remains and a variety of movable objects, some dated to the First Temple period, many to the Second Temple period, as well as the Byzantine and Early Muslim periods, the latter including major findings from the Umayyad and Fatimid periods.

The findings included remains interpreted by archaeologist Eilat Mazar to be a 70 or 79 metres long segment of city wall including a gatehouse leading to a royal structure, and a watchtower overlooking the Kidron Valley. Eilat Mazar believes these are the remains of the fortifications that, according to the biblical First Book of Kings, once encompassed the city. Eilat Mazar, who re-excavated the remains in 2010, believes them to date to the late 10th century BCE, associating them with King Solomon, which is controversial and not supported by past and contemporary archaeologists.

Also present were several Hellenistic-period buildings, a large mikvah, the southern steps to the Herodian Temple compound, leading up to the Double and Triple Gates of the Temple compound, the Monastery of the Virgins, and several large residential and administrative structures (qasr-type "palaces"), probably Umayyad, to the south of the ophel.

A discovered artefact of particular importance is the ophel inscription, a 3000-year-old pottery shard that bears the earliest alphabetical inscription found in Jerusalem.

Archaeological assessment
Although consensus on the dating of the wall has not been reached by the archaeological community, Mazar maintains that, "It's the most significant construction we have from First Temple days in Israel," and "It means that at that time, the 10th century (BCE), in Jerusalem there was a regime capable of carrying out such construction." The 10th century is the period the Bible describes as the reign of King Solomon. Claiming that broken pottery in the "royal structure" enabled the team to date the building. One storage jar bears an inscription in Hebrew. Mazar told the Jerusalem Post that "The jars that were found are the largest ever found in Jerusalem," and "the inscription found on one of them shows that it belonged to a government official, apparently the person responsible for overseeing the provision of baked goods to the royal court."

Aren Maeir, an archeology professor at Bar Ilan University said he has yet to see evidence that the fortifications are as old as Mazar claims. Whilst acknowledging that 10th century remains have been found in Jerusalem, he describes proof of a strong, centralized kingdom at that time as "tenuous".

According to Mazar, the built structures are similar to the First Temple era fortifications of Megiddo, Beersheba and Ashdod. Mazar told reporters that "A comparison of this latest finding with city walls and gates from the period of the First Temple, as well as pottery found at the site," enable her to "postulate, with a great degree of assurance" that the wall dates form the late 10th-century BCE.

Mazar told reporters that "A comparison of this latest finding with city walls and gates from the period of the First Temple, as well as pottery found at the site, enable us to postulate, with a great degree of assurance, that the wall that has been revealed is that which was built by King Solomon in Jerusalem in the latter part of the tenth century BCE."

The wall has been excavated twice before, once in the 1860s and again in the 1980s. In 1867 Charles Warren conducted an underground survey in the area, describing the outline of a large tower but without attributing it to the era of Solomon.

Israel Finkelstein and other archaeologists from Tel Aviv University have flagged concern that, with reference to her 2006 dating of the "Solomonic city wall" in the area to the south of the Temple Mount known as the ophel, "the biblical text dominates this field operation, not archaeology. Had it not been for Mazar's literal reading of the biblical text, she never would have dated the remains to the 10th century BCE with such confidence".

Samaria ophel
 speaks of the ophel of Samaria, where Gehazi took the presents he received from Naaman of Aram. Traditionally translated as "hill", it can as well have meant "tower" and can quite likely be understood as a spot in the city wall or its citadel.

King Mesha's ophel
Here, too, the context indicates part of a fortification - either a fortified hill, or something like a tower or enceinte and, judging by the root of the word, probably a bulging or rounded one.

See also
 Acropolis – similar concept in ancient Greek architecture
For the Jerusalem Ophel
Acra (fortress)
Desert castles: Umayyad qasr-type palaces including Qasr al-Minya and Al-Sinnabra on the Sea of Galilee
Excavations at the Temple Mount
Givati Parking Lot dig
Jerusalem pilgrim road a.k.a. the stepped pilgrimage road
Jerusalem Water Channel, actually the drainage under the stepped pilgrimage road
 Millo
Ophel Treasure, a gold hoard from the early 7th century

Further reading

References

External links
 Bible Hub: Ophel. Excellent overview, based on critical analysis of the texts; only partially outdated (article predates most excavations on the eastern hill).
 Jerusalem Archaeological Park. History of archaeological investigation 1838-2000. Does not include important new findings by Eilat Mazar.The Jerusalem Archaeological Park - homepage
 Jerusalem 101: Ophel. Location of the Ophel: plans, models, some photos. Some mix-up of slightly differing First and Second Temple-period locations. Ophel - Jerusalem 101
 George Wesley Buchanan, Misunderstandings About Jerusalem's Temple Mount, Washington Report on Middle East Affairs, August 2011, Pages 16, 64. Supports the very controversial "southern location" theory placing both Jerusalem Temples above the Gihon Spring, rather than on the Temple Mount. Misunderstandings About Jerusalem's Temple Mount
 Another "southern location" theory article (dead link, as of August 2016) 

Ancient history of Jerusalem
Architectural history